Cellvibrio is a genus of Gammaproteobacteria. The cells are slender curved rods. Cellvibrio is (like all Proteobacteria) Gram-negative.

References

External links
 Cellvibrio'' J.P. Euzéby: List of Prokaryotic names with Standing in Nomenclature

Pseudomonadales
Bacteria genera